Replay is a Canadian sports talk show television series which aired on CBC Television from 1971 to 1974.

Premise
This sports talk show featured interviews with sports personalities and filmed segments. Recording was conducted in various Canadian cities during the series run.

Scheduling
Hour-long pilot episodes were broadcast on selected Saturdays at 4:00 p.m. (Eastern time) from April to June 1971. These were hosted by Canadian Football League player Russ Jackson and CBC sportscaster Tom McKee with guests as follows:

 10 April 1971: Mari-Lou MacDonald (stunt performer), Doug Sanders, Derek Sanderson
 1 May 1971: George Chuvalo, Jacques Plante, George Plimpton, Dick Thornton
 15 May 1971, 5 June 1971: Lloyd Percival (on location at his Toronto fitness centre), Abby Hoffman, Karen Magnussen

Replay was then broadcast for three regular seasons on Saturday evenings with Jackson returning as host, while Bob Moir became his sportscaster co-host instead of McKee. These seasons aired as follows:

References

External links
 

CBC Television original programming
1971 Canadian television series debuts
1974 Canadian television series endings